KRI Multatuli (561) is a command ship operated by the Indonesian Navy.

Design and construction
The ship was designed and constructed by Japanese shipbuilder Ishikawajima-Harima. She was laid down at the company's Tokyo shipyard on 13 June 1961. She was commissioned into the Indonesian Navy in August 1961. Originally designed as a submarine support ship, Multatuli was converted into a fleet command ship for Eastern Command during the late 1960s.

She is armed with six  anti-aircraft guns in two single and two twin mounts, and four  anti-aircraft guns in two twin mounts. A  gun was originally fitted aft, but this was replaced by a helicopter platform. A hangar was added in 1998. The ship's company is made up of 134 personnel. The vessel is capable of providing replenishment at sea.

Operational history
Multatuli is operational as of 2007.

References

Ships of the Indonesian Navy
Ships built by IHI Corporation
1961 ships